The action of 30 May 1781 was a naval battle fought between two frigates of the Royal Navy and two of the Dutch Republic off the Barbary Coast.  In the Netherlands it is known as the zeegevecht bij Kaap Sint-Marie (sea battle of Cape St Mary, after the Cabo de Santa Maria). In a battle lasting more than two hours, Captain William Peere Williams-Freeman of the Flora (36 guns), compelled Captain Pieter Melvill's Castor (36 guns) to strike her colours.  Shortly after, Captain Gerardus Oorthuys of den Briel (36 guns) compelled Thomas Pakenham to strike Crescent (28 guns).  However, Flora came to Crescent rescue before Oorthuys could board her, and forced him to retreat.

Background
During the Fourth Anglo-Dutch War a fleet  from the Dutch East Indies left the Mediterranean, escorted by the 36-gun frigates Castor under captain Pieter Melvill van Carnbee and the Den Briel under captain Gerardus Oorthuys. They did not pass Gibraltar unnoticed and were intercepted by two British frigates, the 36-gun  under captain William Peere Williams-Freeman and the 28-gun  under captain Thomas Pakenham. The Dutch frigates reached the Atlantic and fired a salvo at their pursuers, frightening them off, but Carnbee decided not to pursue the faster British ships but to proceed with their primary objective of escorting the merchantmen. The Dutch ships thus turned south under cover of darkness to reach the Canary Islands.

Battle

On the morning of 30 May 1781 the Dutch saw the British ships following them. The British opened fire and Carnbee and Oorthuys tried and failed to get one of the British ships between them. The battle then became a ship-to-ship action between the Den Briel and the Crescent in one case and the Castor and the Flora in the other. The Castor was a 23-year-old ship with low calibre guns and a maximum salvo of 372 pounds, thus proving no match for the modern Flora with its 720-pound salvo. The Castor soon became unmanageable, with her sails and rigging destroyed, holes below the waterline, five feet of water in her hold, most of her guns out of action, 30 of her 230-man crew killed and 40 wounded. Carnbee hoisted a white flag, he and his crew were taken on board the Flora and the sinking Castor was taken in tow as a prize ship.

The battle between Den Briel and the Crescent was a mirror image of the defeat of the Castor. The guns of the Den Briel brought down the main-mast and mizzen-mast of the Crescent for only 12 dead and 44 wounded, compared to the toll on the Crescent of 27 dead and 65 wounded (including her captain, who was slightly injured). Both ships were badly damaged however and an hour after the Crescent surrendered the mast of the Den Briel fell overboard. The Dutch ship also did not have any boats left in a seaworthy condition to take the Crescent as a prize. The Crescent then managed to get taken in tow by the Flora and Oorthuys had to watch his prize escape.

Aftermath
Using makeshift sails Oorthuys then reached the port of Cadiz on 2 June, whilst the fleet he was escorting also reached Spain without being attacked by the British. With two badly damaged ships in tow, Pakenham then met two French frigates in the English Channel and was defeated, though the Flora escaped. Pakenham had refused to resume the command of the Crescent, maintaining that by his surrender to the Den Briel his commission was cancelled, and that when recaptured the ship was on the same footing as any other prize. The Castor thus became a French prize (though it was beyond use and soon demolished in a French shipyard) and Carnbee and the Dutch prisoners were repatriated.

The battle became major news back in the Netherlands, with Carnbee and Oorthuys compared to earlier Dutch naval commanders such as Michiel de Ruyter and Maarten Tromp. In Britain, Pakenham was tried by court-martial for striking the flat to the Dutch but honourably acquitted, it being proved that he did not strike the flag till, by the fall of her masts and the disabling of her guns, further resistance was impossible.

References
Dirks, Jacobus Johannes Backer. De nederlandsche zeemagt in hare verschillende tijdperken geschetst, Volume 3 (one Dutch account)
The United Service Magazine, Part 2 (a brief English account)
Gerrits, Gerrit Engelberts. Fastes de la marine hollandaise, tr. par F. Douchez (French translation of a detailed Dutch account)
 Oorthuys' captain's log 'Part 1', 'Part 2'

Conflicts in 1781
Naval battles of the Fourth Anglo-Dutch War
Naval battles involving Great Britain
Naval battles involving the Dutch Republic